John Kemp (1380–1454) was Archbishop of Canterbury and Lord Chancellor of England.

John Kemp or Johnny Kemp may also refer to:

Sports
John Kemp (Australian footballer) (born 1944), Australian football player
John Kemp (baseball), Negro league baseball player
John Kemp (cricketer, born 1928), South African cricketer
John Kemp (cricketer, born 1952), South African cricketer
John Kemp (New Zealand footballer) (1940–1993), New Zealand international football (soccer) player

Others
John Kemp, 1st Viscount Rochdale (1906–1993), British peer, soldier and businessman
John Arthur Kemp (1926–1987), master mariner, author, educationalist
St John Kemp, 2nd Viscount Rochdale (born 1938)
John Kemp (antiquary) (1665–1717), English collector
John Kemp (mathematician) (1763–1812), Scots-born mathematician who moved to New York
John Dan Kemp (born c. 1951), Chief Justice of Arkansas
John D. Kemp (born 1949), American disability rights leader
Jonathan Johnny Kemp (1959–2015), Bahamian singer, songwriter, and record producer